was the shortest railway tunnel in Japan, at 7.2 meters in length, until its abandonment in 2014. It was built in 1946, and was located on the Agatsuma Line in Gunma Prefecture at 36°33'50.2"N 138°43'21.2"E.  The tunnel was abandoned after a nearby portion of the line was inundated by the construction of the Yanba Dam.

References

Railway tunnels in Japan
Tunnels completed in 1946